SS William W. Loring was a Liberty ship built in the United States during World War II. She was named after William Wing Loring, a Colonel in the United States Army that fought in the Mexican–American War. He joined the Confederate States Army during the American Civil War reaching the rank of Major General. After the war he was recommended to Isma'il Pasha, by William Tecumseh Sherman, for his army in Egypt, where he also obtained the rank of Major General.

Construction
William W. Loring was laid down on 29 November 1943, under a Maritime Commission (MARCOM) contract, MC hull 1546, by J.A. Jones Construction, Panama City, Florida; she was launched on 17 January 1944.

History
She was allocated to T.J. Stevenson & Co., Inc., on 7 March 1944. On 30 November 1945, she was laid up in the National Defense Reserve Fleet, in Mobile, Alabama. On 18 September 1958, she was sold, along with 34 other ships, for $2,666,680 to Bethlehem Steel, for scrapping. She was removed from the fleet on 23 October 1958.

References

Bibliography

 
 
 
 
 

 

Liberty ships
Ships built in Panama City, Florida
1944 ships
Mobile Reserve Fleet